The FA Cup 1953–54 is the 73rd season of the world's oldest football knockout competition; The Football Association Challenge Cup, or FA Cup for short. The large number of clubs entering the tournament from lower down the English football league system meant that the competition started with a number of preliminary and qualifying rounds. The 30 victorious teams from the Fourth Round Qualifying progressed to the First Round Proper.

Preliminary round

Ties

Replays

1st qualifying round

Ties

Replays

2nd replays

3rd replay

2nd qualifying round

Ties

Replays

3rd qualifying round

Ties

Replays

4th qualifying round
The teams that given byes to this round are Bishop Auckland, Yeovil Town, Leytonstone, Gainsborough Trinity, Stockton, Witton Albion, Weymouth, North Shields, Rhyl, Hereford United, Scarborough, Wigan Athletic, Nelson, Tonbridge, Blyth Spartans, Wellington Town, Buxton, Folkestone, Bath City, Llanelli, Peterborough United, Finchley, Great Yarmouth Town and Grays Athletic.

Ties

Replays

1953–54 FA Cup
See 1953–54 FA Cup for details of the rounds from the First Round Proper onwards.

External links
Football Club History Database: FA Cup 1953–54
FA Cup Past Results

Qualifying
FA Cup qualifying rounds